Ernest Albert "Pip" Baker (3 January 1929 – 14 April 2020) and Iris E. E. "Jane" Baker (30 December 1924 – 29 August 2014), professionally known as Pip and Jane Baker, were an English husband-and-wife team of television writers known mainly for their contributions to the BBC science-fiction series Doctor Who.

The Bakers scripted or contributed to four serials for the programme in the 1980s: The Mark of the Rani (1985), The Trial of a Time Lord (1986), Parts 9–12 and 14 (also known as Terror of the Vervoids and The Ultimate Foe); and Time and the Rani (1987). They have also written novelisations of these stories, as well as a Make Your Own Adventure With Doctor Who (Find Your Fate With Doctor Who in the United States) gamebook titled Race Against Time. Pip and Jane's audio story The Rani Reaps the Whirlwind featured the return of the Rani and was released in 2000.

Other work

Their play A Matter of Balance was adapted into the film The Third Alibi (1961). They worked on several other films in the 1960s including Night of the Big Heat (1967) and Captain Nemo and the Underwater City (1969). They also wrote four episodes of the TV series The Pursuers starring Louis Hayward.

From the mid-1970s, they worked more in television, including the six-part children's thriller Circus. They scripted the episode "A Matter of Balance" (1976) for Gerry Anderson's TV series Space: 1999,.

In the 1990s, they created and wrote the CBBC series Watt on Earth, the eponymous Watt being an alien who is trapped on Earth.

Deaths

Jane Baker died on 29 August 2014, at the age of 89. Pip Baker died on 14 April 2020, at the age of 91.

References

External links
 
 
 On Target: Biography of Pip and Jane Baker
 
 

20th-century English non-fiction writers
BBC people
British science fiction writers
English children's writers
English science fiction writers
English screenwriters
English television writers
Screenwriting duos
Married couples